Lachlan John Scott (born 15 April 1997) is an Australian professional soccer player who plays as a forward for Wollongong Wolves.

Club career

Western Sydney Wanderers
In May 2016, Scott was promoted by Western Sydney Wanderers to the senior squad. He made his professional debut for the Wanderers in the 2016 FFA Cup against A-League side Wellignton Phoenix, scoring the first 2 goals of the Wanderers' comeback from trailing 0–2 to a 3–2 victory.

Wollongong Wolves
In February 2019, Scott was released by mutual consent by Western Sydney Wanderers and a few days later signed for Wollongong Wolves.

Career statistics

Club

Honours

Club
Western Sydney Wanderers FC|Western Sydney Wanderers
 Y-League Championship: 2017–18

International 
Australia U20
 AFF U-19 Youth Championship: 2016

References

External links

1997 births
Living people
Australian soccer players
APIA Leichhardt FC players
Western Sydney Wanderers FC players
Wollongong Wolves FC players
Sportspeople from Wollongong
Association football forwards
National Premier Leagues players